This is a list of the described species of the harvestman family Stygnidae. The data is taken from Joel Hallan's Biology Catalog.

Heterostygninae
Heterostygninae Roewer, 1913

 Eutimesius Roewer, 1913
 Eutimesius albicinctus (Roewer, 1915) — Venezuela
 Eutimesius ephippiatus (Roewer, 1915) — Colombia
 Eutimesius ornatus (Roewer, 1943) — Colombia, Venezuela
 Eutimesius simoni Roewer, 1913 — Peru, Brazil, Colombia, Ecuador

 Innoxius Pinto-da-Rocha, 1997
 Innoxius magnus (Caporiacco, 1951) — Venezuela

 Minax Pinto-da-Rocha, 1997
 Minax tetraspinosus Pinto-da-Rocha, 1997 — Venezuela

 Stenostygnellus Roewer, 1913
 Stenostygnellus flavolimbatus Roewer, 1913 — Venezuela
 Stenostygnellus macrochelis (Roewer, 1917) — Venezuela

 Stygnidius Simon, 1879
 Stygnidius guerinii Sørensen, 1932 — French Guayana
 Stygnidius inflatus (Guérin-Méneville, 1829-1843) — Brazil, Venezuela, French Guiana

 Stygnoplus Simon, 1879
 Stygnoplus antiguanus (Roewer, 1943) — Leeward Islands, Antigua
 Stygnoplus biguttatus Pinto-da-Rocha, 1997 — Venezuela
 Stygnoplus clavotibialis (Goodnight & Goodnight, 1947) — Trinidad
 Stygnoplus dominicanus (Roewer, 1943) — Dominica
 Stygnoplus flavitarsis (Simon, 1879) — Leeward Islands, Guadeloupe
 Stygnoplus forcipatus (C.L. Koch, 1845) — Colombia
 Stygnoplus granulosus Mello-Leitão, 1940 — Venezuela
 Stygnoplus longipalpus (Goodnight & Goodnight, 1942) — British Guiana
 Stygnoplus meinerti Sørensen, 1932 — Venezuela
 Stygnoplus triacanthus (C.L. Koch, 1839) — South America
 Stygnoplus tuberculatus (Goodnight & Goodnight, 1942) — Dominica

 Timesius Simon, 1879
 Timesius vesicularis (Gervais, 1844) — Colombia

 Yapacana Pinto-da-Rocha, 1997
 Yapacana tibialis (Pinto-da-Rocha, 1997) — Venezuela

Nomoclastinae
Nomoclastinae Roewer, 1943

 Nomoclastes Sørensen, 1932
 Nomoclastes quasimodo Pinto-da-Rocha, 1997 — Colombia
 Nomoclastes taedifer Sørensen, 1932 — Colombia

Stygninae
Stygninae Simon, 1879

 Actinostygnoides Goodnight & Goodnight, 1942
 Actinostygnoides carus Goodnight & Goodnight, 1942 — British Guiana

 Auranus Mello-Leitão, 1941
 Auranus hoeferscovitorum Pinto-da-Rocha, 1997 — Brazil
 Auranus parvus Mello-Leitão, 1941 — Brazil

 Iguarassua Roewer, 1943
 Iguarassua schubarti Roewer, 1943 — Brazil

 Kaapora Pinto-da-Rocha, 1997
 Kaapora minutissimus (Roewer, 1943) — Brazil

 Metaphareus Roewer, 1912
 Metaphareus albimanus Roewer, 1912 — Colombia
 Metaphareus punctatus Roewer, 1913 — Venezuela

 Niceforoiellus Mello-Leitão, 1941
 Niceforoiellus assimilis Mello-Leitão, 1941 — Colombia

 Ortonia Wood, 1869
 Ortonia ferox Wood, 1869 — Ecuador

 Paraphareus Goodnight & Goodnight, 1943
 Paraphareus tatei Goodnight & Goodnight, 1943 — Monte Roraima: British Guiana?, Brazil

 Phareus Simon, 1879
 Phareus raptator (Gervais, 1844) — Colombia, Venezuela

 Pickeliana Mello-Leitão, 1932
 Pickeliana capito (Soares & Soares, 1974)
 Pickeliana pickeli Mello-Leitão, 1932 — Brazil

 Planophareus Goodnight & Goodnight, 1943
 Planophareus pallidus Goodnight & Goodnight, 1943 — Monte Roraima, Brazil

 Protimesius Roewer, 1913
 Protimesius albilineatus (Roewer, 1957) — Peru, Brazil
 Protimesius amplichelis (Roewer, 1931) — Brazil
 Protimesius apiacas Pinto-da-Rocha, 2000 — Brazil
 Protimesius coxalis (Roewer, 1931) —  Brazil
 Protimesius evelineae (Soares & Soares, 1978) — Brazil
 Protimesius gracilis Roewer, 1913 — Brazil, Suriname, French Guiana
 Protimesius laevis (Sørensen, 1932) — Brazil
 Protimesius longipalpis (Roewer, 1943) — Brazil
 Protimesius mendopictus (H. E. M. Soares, 1978) — Brazil
 Protimesius palpalis (Roewer, 1931) — Brazil
 Protimesius trocaraincola Pinto-da-Rocha, 1997 — Brazil

 Sickesia H. E. M. Soares, 1979
 Sickesia helmuti H. E. M. Soares, 1979 — Brazil

 Stenophareus Goodnight & Goodnight, 1943
 Stenophareus roraimus Goodnight & Goodnight, 1943 — Roraima, Brazil

 Stenostygnoides Roewer, 1913
 Stenostygnoides cosmetitarsus Roewer, 1913 — Surinam

 Stygnus Perty, 1833
 Stygnus aggerum Sørensen, 1932 — Venezuela
 Stygnus armatus Perty, 1833 — Brazil
 Stygnus brevispinis Pinto-da-Rocha, 1997 — Bolivia
 Stygnus ferrugineus (Perty, 1833) — Brazil, French Guiana
 Stygnus gertschi (Roewer, 1963) — Colombia
 Stygnus grasshoffi Pinto-da-Rocha, 1997 — Venezuela
 Stygnus klugi (Goodnight & Goodnight, 1943) — Peru
 Stygnus lesserti (Roewer, 1943) — Brazil
 Stygnus luteus (Mello-Leitão, 1931) — Brazil
 Stygnus marthae Pinto-da-Rocha, 1997 — Brazil
 Stygnus mediocris (Roewer, 1931) — Ecuador
 Stygnus multispinosus (Piza, 1938) — Brazil
 Stygnus pectinipes (Roewer, 1943) — Surinam, Brazil, Colombia
 Stygnus peruvianus (Roewer, 1957) — Peru
 Stygnus polyacanthus (Mello-Leitão, 1923) — Brazil
 Stygnus simonis Sørensen, 1932 — Peru
 Stygnus simplex (Roewer, 1913) — Ecuador, Colombia, Peru
 Stygnus weyrauchi (Roewer, 1963) — Peru

 Verrucastygnus Pinto-da-Rocha, 1997
 Verrucastygnus caliginosus (R. Pinto-da-Rocha, 1990) — Brazil

incertae sedis
incertae sedis

 Gaibulus Roewer, 1943
 Gaibulus schubarti Roewer, 1943 — Brazil

References
 Joel Hallan's Biology Catalog: Stygnidae

Stygnidae
Stygnidae